Jill Stein may refer to:

 Jill Stein (born 1950) American physician
 Jill Stein (restaurateur)